Don't Close Your Eyes (Ashamed) is a song written by Dominick Wickliffe, Jonathan Hay, Bob McDill, Joshua Rowe, Morgan McRae and Ajami about alcohol abuse, adoption and suicide. The song is performed by Kxng Crooked fka Crooked I of Slaughterhouse, Truth Ali, Jonathan Hay and Morgan McRae. The chorus of the song was originally performed by American country music artist Keith Whitley. The demo version of the song premiered on Billboard on July 1, 2015, on what would have been Whitley's 61st birthday. The music video of the song premiered on MTV News on August 27, 2015.

Background

Billboard Magazine announced the release of "Don't Close Your Eyes (Ashamed)" a tribute to the late Keith Whitley on his 60th birthday. The song is performed by Shady Records recording artist Kxng Crooked fka Crooked I (from Slaughterhouse), Truth Ali, Jonathan Hay and Morgan McRae. "I feel the rap verses really capture the emotional torment of the original," producer Jonathan Hay explained to Billboard Magazine.

Kxng Crooked has battled alcohol abuse on and off for years and told MTV News, “I’ve been in several dark places in my life. Betrayed by those closest to me or feelings of hopelessness in situations I can’t control or even others trying to remove me from this earth… It takes its toll. I have to rise above and keep moving forward for myself and my loved ones. I like to meditate and read a lot so that helps. Music is my ultimate medicine, though."

Music video

The music video was filmed in Louisville, Kentucky and is the first part of a five-part series for producer Jonathan Hay, who had the idea to recreate late county singer Keith Whitley's 1988 single as part of a video series. Whitley died of alcohol poisoning in 1989. The heavy subject matter of the track links not only the pitfalls of alcoholism but also child abuse, suicide and depression. The video pays homage to famed filmmaker Alfred Hitchcock and each of the visuals in the series will appear in black and white.

"Don't Close Your Eyes (Ashamed)" is from Hay's upcoming The Urban Hitchcock LP with features from Cyhi The Prynce, Canibus, Royce da 5'9", Skyzoo, Planet Asia, Professor Griff of Public Enemy, Chino XL and more.

References

2015 songs
Keith Whitley songs
Songs written by Bob McDill
Country ballads